The 141st Indiana Infantry Regiment was an infantry regiment from Indiana that failed to complete its organization to serve in the Union Army during the American Civil War. The enlisted men were transferred to the 140th Indiana Infantry Regiment.

See also

 List of Indiana Civil War regiments

References

Bibliography 
 Dyer, Frederick H. (1959). A Compendium of the War of the Rebellion. New York and London. Thomas Yoseloff, Publisher. .
 Holloway, William R. (2004). Civil War Regiments From Indiana. eBookOnDisk.com Pensacola, Florida. .
 Terrell, W.H.H. (1866). The Report of the Adjutant General of the State of Indiana. Containing Rosters for the Years 1861–1865, Volume 3. Indianapolis, Indiana. Samuel M. Douglass, State Printer.

Units and formations of the Union Army from Indiana
1864 establishments in Indiana
Military units and formations established in 1864
Military units and formations disestablished in 1864
1864 disestablishments in Indiana